Rahat Amanullah Bhatti is a Pakistani politician, who had been a member of the National Assembly of Pakistan serving from August 2018 till January 2023. Bhatti secured 110,231 votes defeating Rana Afzaal Hussain of PML-N, who received 94,072 votes in the 2018 elections. Bhatti previously served in Pakistan Army's artillery corps, retiring as a Brigadier  in 1989.

Political career
He was elected to the National Assembly of Pakistan from Constituency NA-119 (Sheikhupura-I) as a candidate of Pakistan Tehreek-e-Insaf in 2018 Pakistani general election.

Mr. Bhatti is a member of the following Standing Committees in the National Assembly:
– Standing Committee on Defence Production
– Standing Committee on Technology
– Standing Committee on Interior

References

External Link
 

 Profile Rahat Aman Ullah Bhatti MNA NA-119 Sheikhupura

More Reading
 List of members of the 15th National Assembly of Pakistan

Living people
Pakistani MNAs 2018–2023
1937 births